Sơn Tinh (Vietnamese pronunciation: /səːn tinɲ/) is a Vietnamese brand of Rượu (Pronunciation: /ɹɨəu/ in south Vietnam, /ʐɨəu/ in the north), a Vietnamese variety of rice liquor. The brand was officially established in 2002  although a variety of its products were already produced in 1997 though without official branding.

Sơn Tinh liquors are based on a distillate from sticky rice and consist of a clear distillate and 11 liqueurs made by maceration of Vietnamese traditional herbs, spices and fruits.
The liquors are traditionally drunk straight in small glasses, however the brand has introduced more modern ways to drink it; on ice, as ingredients of a cocktail or as a mixed alcoholic drink.

History 
Markus Madeja, the founder and originator of the Sơn Tinh liquors, is Swiss-born with a background in social anthropology and linguistics. In 1993, Markus Madeja traveled to Vietnam where his fascination with traditional handicrafts and Vietnamese culture triggered his interest in rice liquor.
Like most other traditional handicrafts in North Vietnam liquor production is organized in traditional handicraft villages in which most of the inhabitants pursue the same profession. Markus’ starting point was the village of Phu Loc in Cam Giang district of Hai Duong province where he studied the traditional way of producing rice liquor. Adopting the villagers’ way of liquor production while adding modern methods of production from his native Switzerland he started a small-scale production of sticky rice liquor together with local villagers. The resulting liquor was further used to macerate traditional herbs and local fruits. The herbal recipes of Sơn Tinh are inspired by traditional herbal recipes.
By 1999 Markus had refined more than 20 recipes and together with his business partner, Dan Dockery, and wife, Vu Thi Thoa, opened a small liquor bar, Highway4, in Hanoi in 2000.
Markus’ stated goal is to “preserve a traditional Vietnamese handicraft product and not only save it from getting lost by the rapid encroachment of globalisation but bring it to a wider international audience”.

Production 
During the initial years of production maceration of the ingredients was done in traditional earthen jars with a volume of up to 220 litres in the home of Markus Madeja involving many manual tasks. By 2004 this way of production didn't fulfill the rising demand of the, by then two, Highway4 restaurants anymore. As a result, a new production facility was built in the village of Lệ Chi in the suburban district of Gia Lâm, Hanoi. At this time distillation was switched from a traditional pot still to a modern, German-built copper still with fractioning column.

Maceration of herbs and fruits was now moved to chrome steel tanks. The time of maceration for a typical batch ranges from 1 to 5 years. After filtration the liquor is further matured for 2–3 years. 
As all ingredients of the Sơn Tinh liquors are natural, and cold-filtration is avoided to preserve the full flavour, some sedimentation might appear in the bottled products, or the liquor might show some cloudiness when cooled to very low temperatures or when water is added.

Products 
The range of Sơn Tinh products currently (as of 2014) consists of 12 different types, all produced from natural raw materials without the addition of any artificial flavouring, colouring or clearing agents. Almost all raw materials (with the exception of Korean white ginseng) are sourced in Vietnam. The products come in 2 different strengths of alcohol, 27% Vol. (for all the fruit types and the Nep Cam type), and 38% Vol. (for all the herbal types and the clear Nep Phu Loc distillate)

The 12 flavours are:
 Rose Apple (Táo Mèo); 27% alc. Vol.: The Tao Meo fruit tree (Docynia indica (Wall)) is grown semi-cultivated in north-western Vietnam's mountain regions of Yen Bai, Lao Cai and Tuyen Quang. As there is no common English name for the fruit and the tree is in the family of the roses (Rosaceae) the owners of Son Tinh decided to give it the name “Rose Apple”. 
 Apricot (Mơ Vàng); 27% alc. Vol.: The apricots used are grown semi-cultivated in forested orchards in the northern Vietnamese mountain region of Bac Kan. The variety is similar to Japanese apricots. The fruits are deep yellow when ripe and small (1.5–3 cm in diameter), with a thick skin and a relatively big stone. The taste is sour and very tart making the fruits almost inedible by themselves.
 Red Plum (Mận Đỏ); 27% alc. Vol.: The plums are grown in north-western Vietnam's mountain regions of Lao Cai, Dien Bien and Son La. The fruits are similar to the English Victoria plum with yellow flesh and a red to green skin. The variety from Sa Pa in Lao Cao province, however, has deep red flesh and is called “Blood plum” (Mận máu).
 Passionfruit (Chanh Leo); 27% alc. Vol.: Most of the Passionfruits in Vietnam are grown in the Central Highlands, a mountain region in southern Vietnam. The fruits used are of the purple variety.
 Red Sticky Rice (Nếp Cẩm); 27% alc. Vol.: Both the method of production and the taste of Sơn Tinh Nếp Cẩm is similar to Portuguese port. In mid-fermentation the residual natural sugar is preserved in the rice by adding clear sticky rice liquor. Red sticky rice fermented with local yeast (similar to Japanese koji) is used for a wide range of very traditional dishes and drinks.
 Sticky Rice (Nếp Phú Lộc); 38% alc. Vol.: This is a clear distillate from a fragrant sticky rice variety grown in the Red River delta. The sticky rice used is unpolished, which preserves the distinct fragrance of the rice. Combined with slow distillation in a copper still the resulting distillate has flavours of young rice kernels, fresh bread and butter.
 Minh Mạng Herbal Blend; 38% alc. Vol.: Vietnam's most famous herbal liquor is associated with the name of Emperor Minh Mạng who ruled in the 19th century. Sơn Tinh Minh Mạng is an adaptation of one of his herbal concoctions. The Minh Mạng blend is made from 19 herbal ingredients.
 Vương Tửu Herbal Blend; 38% alc. Vol.: This herbal concoction is based on a traditional recipe produced for a Chinese empress, Từ Hy Thái Hậu (vietn.). The Empress was renowned for her virility and joy of life. The Vương Tửu blend is made from 27 herbal ingredients.
 White Ginseng Herbal Blend (Bạch Sâm); 38% alc. Vol.: The 6-year old white ginseng used for this herbal blend is imported from South Korea.
 Bổ Sa Pa Herbal Blend; 38% alc. Vol.: The formula for this herbal liquor was developed and refined by herbalists in the mountain resort town of Sa Pa, Lao Cai province", which is located in the mountainous far north-west of Vietnam. It contains more than 30 ingredients.
 Mỹ Tửu Herbal Blend; 38% alc. Vol.: The Mỹ Tửu blend consists of 11 ingredients grown mainly in the mountainous regions of north-western Vietnam.
 Nhất Dạ Herbal Blend; 38% alc. Vol.: The formula for this herbal liquor was created in the tradition of stimulating and invigorating Vietnamese bitters with more than 30 ingredients.

Drinking style and usage 
Traditionally Vietnamese drank liquor in small tea cups or glasses in a “bottom-up” way.
 
In an effort to move away from the “in a small shot glass” way of drinking, Sơn Tinh has in 2011 introduced in its Highway4 restaurants a bulb-shaped glass with a wider opening. This was to increase the focus of drinking on taste and fragrance, aspects that were traditionally of minor importance. Another trend set by Son Tinh was to drink the sweeter fruit types with ice in larger glasses.

In 2012 Sơn Tinh was approached by a bar consultant from the UK, John Collingwood, who was intrigued by the unique flavours of the Son Tinh liquors and their potential use as ingredients in Western-style cocktails. In close cooperation Sơn Tinh and John Collingwood developed a range of cocktails that merge international and Vietnamese ingredients with the flavours of Sơn Tinh liquors and international liquors creating new variations of classic cocktails.

Examples of such fusion cocktails:
 Bitter Sweet Salute: This cocktail is a variation of the classic Negroni cocktail. However the Campari and Gin have been replaced with Sơn Tinh's Vương Tửu and Nếp Phú Lộc respectively.
 Highway4 Old Fashioned: A variation of the “Old Fashioned” cocktail with Bổ Sa Pa and Mận Đỏ (Red Plum).

International awards 
In 2011 Sơn Tinh decided to subject its only locally known products to the scrutiny of international experts by submitting them to a number of renowned international spirits competitions. In these competitions the submitted products undergo blind tasting with a number of criteria relevant to the quality of the products, e.g. complexity, taste, colour, consistency, etc. While some competitions only award medals in different categories some also apply a point scoring method.
Over the last 4 years Sơn Tinh has received the following awards and nominations:

International Wine and Spirits Competition (IWSC) 2011, London, UK:
Silver Medal – Best in Class for Sơn Tinh Rose Apple (Táo Mèo) Liquor

Silver Medal for Sơn Tinh Mỹ Tửu Herbal Blend

World Spirits Awards (WSA) 2012, Klagenfurt, Austria:

Gold Medal (93 points) for Sơn Tinh Nếp Phú Lộc Sticky Rice Liquor

Gold Medal (92 points) for Sơn Tinh Bổ Sa Pa Herbal Blend

Gold Medal (90 points) for Sơn Tinh Minh Mạng Herbal Liquor

Hong Kong International Wine & Spirit Competition (HKIWSC) 2012, Hong Kong:

Bronze Medal for Sơn Tinh Nếp Phú Lộc Sticky Rice Liquor

Bronze Medal for Sơn Tinh Apricot (Mơ Vàng) Liquor

Bronze Medal for Sơn Tinh Minh Mạng Herbal Liquor

San Francisco World Spirits Competition (SFWSC) 2013, San Francisco, US:

Bronze Medal for Sơn Tinh Nếp Phú Lộc Sticky Rice Liquor

Bronze Medal for Sơn Tinh Red Plum (Mận Đỏ) Liquor

Bronze Medal for Sơn Tinh Rose Apple (Táo Mèo) Liquor

Bronze Medal for Sơn Tinh White Ginseng (Bạch Sâm) Liquor

Beverage Testing Institute (BTI) 2013, Chicago, US:

Silver Medal (86 points: Highly Recommended) for Sơn Tinh Nếp Phú Lộc Sticky Rice Liquor

New York International Spirits Competition (NYISC) 2013, New York, US:

Silver Medal for Sơn Tinh Passionfruit (Chanh Leo) Liquor

Distillery of the Year – Category Liqueurs

Superior Taste Awards by the International Taste & Quality Institute (ITQI) 2014, Brussel, Belgium:

2 Golden Stars (overall mark in between 80 and 90%: remarkable taste) for Sơn Tinh Nếp Phú Lộc Sticky Rice Liquor

Asian Spirits Masters (ASM) 2014, London, UK:

Gold Medal for Sơn Tinh Mơ Vàng (Apricot) Liquor

Silver Medal for Sơn Tinh Nếp Phú Lộc Sticky Rice Liquor

Silver Medal for Sơn Tinh Nhất Dạ Herbal Blend

Melbourne International Spirits Competition (MISC) 2014, Melbourne, Australia:

Silver Medal for Sơn Tinh Nếp Phú Lộc Sticky Rice Liquor

Bronze Medal for Sơn Tinh Rose Apple (Táo Mèo) Liquor

Bronze Medal for Sơn Tinh Vương Tửu Herbal Blend

Vietnam Distillery of the Year 2014

Beverage Testing Institute (BTI) 2015, Chicago, USA:

Gold Medal for Sơn Tinh Nếp Cẩm Red Sticky Rice Liquor (94 Points, Exceptional)

The 50 Best Competition in New York, USA:

Gold Medal for Sơn Tinh Rose Apple (Táo Mèo)

Silver Medal for Sơn Tinh Nhất Dạ Herbal Blend

New York International Spirits Competition 2016:

Gold Medal for Sơn Tinh Nếp Phú Lộc Sticky Rice Liquor

Vietnam Distillery of The Year

Singapore World Spirits Competition (SWSC) 2019:

Silver Medal for Sơn Tinh Nếp Phú Lộc Sticky Rice Liquor

Category branding 
Since the first submission to an international spirits competition, Sơn Tinh faced the lack of an appropriate category for its submission. Staunchly refusing to register its distinctively Vietnamese liquor as vodka, shochu or any other nationally branded variety, Sơn Tinh had for years to resort to the category “Others”. However, in 2014 the Asian Spirits Masters competition of The Spirits Business publication from London for the first time acknowledged “Ruou” as a liquor category in its own right

References

External links 
 
 Markus Madeja: Schnapsbrenner in Hanoi
 Pflümli aus Vietnam
 
 Vietnam Culture by the Glass
 Reisschnaps mit Hoden
 

Vietnamese wine
Vietnamese alcoholic drinks
Distilled drinks
Vietnamese brands
Drink companies of Vietnam